Tai Jia or Da Jia, personal name Zǐ Zhì, was the son of Prince Da Ding and a king of the ancient Chinese Shang dynasty.

Biography 
In the Records of the Grand Historian he was listed by Sima Qian as the fourth Shang king, succeeding his uncles Wai Bing and Zhong Ren. He was enthroned in BCE 1535 with Yi Yin as his prime minister and Bo as his capital.

He was an autocratic ruler who treated his people badly and broke his own laws. A few years into his reign saw internal disorder among the court. Prime Minister Yi Yin advised him to change his ways but the headstrong king ignored the advice of the elder statesman. Eventually Yi Yin had no other choice but to exile the king to the Tonggong(literally translated to Tung tree palace, archaic name for the tomb of Tang of Shang), in present-day Southwest Yanshi county, Henan province near the tomb of the first Shang king Tang, to repent.

Sima Qian says that following the exile Yi Yin ruled the country as regent for three years until he felt that the king had sufficiently changed and invited him back to the capital to reclaim his throne. From that point on, the king took care of his people and managed the government well. So that in the 10th year of his reign Yi Yin resigned from his post and retired, honoring the king, after his death, as Zhong Zong (中宗).

The Bamboo Annals however tell a very different story; claiming that after the exile Yi Yin seized the throne and ruled as king for seven years later until Tai Jia secretly returned to the palace and killed his former Prime Minister.  Afterwards the king assigned Yi Yin's land and castle to his sons, Yi She and Yi Fen.

Since archaeological evidence shows that Yi Yin was still worshipped by the Shang people several hundred years after his death, the former account is widely considered the more reliable. According to both sources the king ruled for 12 years before death. He was given the posthumous name Tai Jia and was succeeded by his son Wo Ding.

Oracle script inscriptions on bones unearthed at Yinxu alternatively record that he was the third Shang king, succeeding his father Da Ding, given the posthumous name Da Jia, and succeeded by his brother Bu Bing.

References 

Year of birth unknown
Year of death unknown
Shang dynasty kings